Agonandra brasiliensis (Portuguese common name: pau-marfim) is a timber tree native to Amazon Rainforest and Cerrado vegetation in Brazil. This plant is Brazilian wood export, and it is often used for flooring and furniture, specially chair production.

References

Opiliaceae
Trees of Brazil
Trees of Peru
Plants described in 1862